Marvel Knights 4 is the name of a comic book series featuring the Marvel Comics superhero team, the Fantastic Four.  The series was launched as part of the company's Marvel Knights imprint, and ran for 30 issues (Apr. 2004 – Aug. 2006). All issues in the series were written by playwright Roberto Aguirre-Sacasa, and presented stories that focused less upon science fiction themes than typical Fantastic Four tales.

Publication history
In 2004, Marvel Comics' editor-in-chief Joe Quesada announced that playwright Roberto Aguirre-Sacasa would become the new writer for Fantastic Four, one of the company's flagship titles. Soon thereafter, Marvel announced that Aguirre-Sacasa would be given a new Fantastic Four title to be published under the "Marvel Knights" imprint, and that Mark Waid would continue on the primary series (along with artist Mike Wieringo). Aguirre-Sacasa's series, entitled Marvel Knights 4, ran for 30 issues until its cancellation in 2006.

Collected editions

See also
 Fantastic Four comic book

2004 comics debuts
2006 comics endings
Fantastic Four titles